Events in the year 1902 in Iceland.

Incumbents 
 Monarch: Christian IX
 Minister for Iceland: Peter Adler Alberti

Events 

 20 February – The Federation of Icelandic Cooperative Societies is founded.
 The National Defence Party is established.
 Sögufélag is founded.

References 

 
1900s in Iceland
Years of the 20th century in Iceland
Iceland
Iceland